Jean Frémon (born 1946 in Paris) is a French gallerist and writer. His written work spans and fuses genres, and contributed importantly to a trans-genre tendency in contemporary French letters. Working principally in the modes of ekphrasis, art criticism, literary commentary, narrative, and poetry, Frémon is perhaps unique in his fusion of late 20th century experimentalisms with the deeply rooted French tradition of belles lettres.

After taking a degree in law, Frémon joined the Galerie Maeght, well known for representing important early and mid-20th century artists such as Joan Miró, Marc Chagall, Henri Matisse, and Alexander Calder. After the death of its founder, Aimé Maeght, in 1981, Frémon, along with Daniel Lelong and Jacques Dupin, founded the Galerie Lelong, which continued and extended the work of the Galerie Maeght in its same location at 13 rue de Téhéran in the 8th arrondissement in Paris.

Galerie Lelong, of which Frémon is now the president, also has a branch in the Chelsea district of New York and participates in all the principal annual international art fairs including Art Basel, Art Basel Miami, and FIAC Paris. Artists shown by the gallery include Etel Adnan, Pierre Alechinsky, Francis Bacon, Louise Bourgeois, Nicola De Maria, Jan Dibbets, Günther Förg, Andy Goldsworthy, David Hockney, Donald Judd, Konrad Klapheck, Jannis Kounellis, Wolfgang Laib, Nalini Malani, Ana Mendieta, David Nash, Jaume Plensa, Arnulf Rainer, Robert Ryman, Antonio Saura, Sean Scully, Richard Serra, Kiki Smith, Nancy Spero, Antoni Tàpies, Barthélémy Toguo, and Juan Uslé.

The Work
Early in his writing career, Frémon became associated with the experimental developments represented by the independent publisher Paul Otchakovsky-Laurens and his publishing house, P.O.L, which still publishes much of his work. Frémon has also published with presses dedicated to artists books and artist-writer collaborations, such as Fata Morgana and L’Échoppe, and larger literary houses including Gallimard, Flammarion, and Éditions du Seuil. His writings span a variety of genres, including poetry, novels, and creative non-fiction.

He has also developed a hybrid genre of art-historical fictional essays, in which he takes artists from the Renaissance to the present as characters and through them explores artists, artworks, and their social and political contexts. He has done book-length works in this vein on Robert Ryman, Louise Bourgeois, and Antoni Tàpies, as well as countless shorter works collected in his volumes La Vraie nature des ombres, Gloire des formes, and Rue du Regard. He has also addressed the work of other writers, such as Marcel Proust, Robert Walser, Samuel Beckett, and Michel Leiris in homages stretched by imagination. Since 1969, he has published over twenty volumes as well as many catalogue articles and critical essays on contemporary artists.

His work has been translated into English, Spanish, and German, and he has translated two books by David Sylvester, one on Alberto Giacometti and one on Francis Bacon, both published by André Dimanche.

Bibliography

Le Miroir, les alouettes, Éditions du Seuil, 1969
L’Origine des légendes, Éditions du Seuil, 1972
Discours de la fatigue, Fata Morgana, 1972
  Ce qui n'a pas de visage, Flammarion, 1976
Le Double jeu du tu, Fata Morgana, 1977, with Bernard Noël
L’Envers, Maeght, 1978
L’Exhibitionisme et sa pudeur, Fata Morgana, 1980
Echéance, Flammarion, 1983
Degottex, Éditions du Regard, 1989
Le Jardin Botanique, P.O.L, 1988
Le Singe mendiant, P.O.L, 1991
Proustiennes, Fata Morgana, 1991
Robert Ryman, le paradoxe absolu, L’Échoppe, 1991
Antoni Tàpies, la substance et les accidents, Éditions Unes, 1991
L’Ile des morts, P.O.L, 1994
La Vraie nature des ombres, P.O.L, 2000
Nicola De Maria, L’Échoppe, 2000
Gloire des formes, P.O.L, 2005
Louise Bourgeois Femme Maison, L’Échoppe, 2008
Samuel Beckett dans ses petits souliers, L’Échoppe, 2009
Louise Bourgeois: Moi, Eugénie Grandet, Gallimard, 2010
Naissance (avec Louise Bourgeois), Fata Morgana, 2010
Michel Leiris face à lui-même, L’Échoppe, 2011
Rue du Regard, P.O.L, 2012
La vie posthume de RW, Fata Morgana, 2012
Calme toi, Louison, P.O.L.,2016
L'Effet Wittgenstein, Fata Morgana, 2016
 David Hockney à l'atelier, L'Echoppe, 2017
 Paradoxes de Robert Ryman, L'Echoppe, 2018
 Les élus et les damnés, Fata Morgana, 2019
 Kounellis, homme ancien, artiste moderne, L'Echoppe, 2019
 Le Miroir magique, POL, 2020
 David Hockney en Pays d'Auge, L'Echoppe, 2020
 L'Eloquence de la ligne, entretien avec Saul Steinberg, L'Echoppe, 2021
 La Blancheur de la baleine, POL, 2023

In English translation:
Painting, Black Square Editions, 1999, trans. Brian Evenson
Island of the Dead, Green Integer Books, 2003 trans. Cole Swensen
Distant Noise, Avec Books, 2003, trans. N. Cole, L. Davis, S. Gavronsky, C. Swensen
The Paradoxes of Robert Ryman, Black Square Editions, 2008, trans. Brian Evenson
The Real Life of Shadows, Post Apollo Press, 2009, trans. Cole Swensen
The Botanical Garden, Green Integer Books, 2012, trans. Brian Evenson
The Posthumous Life of RW, Omnidawn, 2014, trans. Cole Swensen
Proustiennes, La Presse, 2016,trans. Brian Evenson
  Now Now, Louison, Les Fugitives, 2018, New Directions, 2019 trans. Cole Swensen
  Nativity, Les Fugitives, 2020;Black Square Editions, 2020, trans Cole Swensen

In Spanish translation:
El Jardin botanico, Espasa Calpe, 1990, trans. Encarna Castejon
La Isla de los muertos, Alianza, 1994, trans. Encarna Castejon
Louise Bourgeois Mujer Casa, Elba, 2008, trans. Milena Busquets
Calle de la Mirada, Elba, 2016, trans. Ignacio Vidal-Folch
  David Hockney "Love life", Elba, 2017, trans. Ignacio Vidal-Folch
  Vamos, Louison, Elba, 2019, trans. Ignacio Vidal-Folch
  El Espejo magico, Elba, 2022, trans.Jose Ramon Monreal

In German translation:
  Die Kehrseite,edition M,1982
  Gleichung,Edition M,1988 
  Loslassen,TM Verlag,1989
  Wellen,edition M,1991, trans Friedhelm Kemp
  Eklipsen,TM Verlag,1992Louise Bourgeois: Moi Eugénie Grandet, Piet Meyer Verlag, 2012, trans. Cordula Unewiese
  RW's Nachleben, Lettre International,2019, trans. Martin Zingg
  Geburt, Lettre International 139, 2022, trans. Martin Zingg

In Norwegian
 Seremoni, Vinduet, Gyldendal norsk Verlag, trans Jorn SvaerenFodsel'', Flamme forlag, 2013,trans. Rune Skoe

References

French male writers
1946 births
Living people